The Australia national cricket team toured India in the 1956–57 season. Three Test matches were played, Australia winning the series 2–0 with one match drawn.

Test matches

1st Test

2nd Test

3rd Test

References

External links
 Cricarchive
 Tour page CricInfo
 Record CricInfo

1956 in Australian cricket
1956 in Indian cricket
1957 in Australian cricket
1957 in Indian cricket
1956-57
Indian cricket seasons from 1945–46 to 1969–70
International cricket competitions from 1945–46 to 1960